Pledgdon Green, also known as Pledgdon or Prison Green, is a hamlet in the parish of Henham, in the Uttlesford district of Essex, England. Nearby settlements include the villages of Broxted and Elsenham.

External links 
 Henham, Recording Uttlesford History

Hamlets in Essex
Henham